Haumoana is a coastal town just south of the Tukituki River outlet in Hawke Bay on the east coast of New Zealand's North Island. It is located 12 km south of Napier and ten kilometres east of Hastings. The village incorporates a school, a Presbyterian Church, a general store, a takeaway shop, a hall and a fire station. The village was developed as a holiday settlement with beaches, and the surrounding area has historically been used for sheep and cattle grazing and horticulture. However, lifestyle blocks and grape growing have become more prominent in recent times. Many inhabitants commute to the nearby cities to work. There are approximately 430 houses in Haumoana. The population at the 2013 census was 2256, an increase of 54 people since 2006.

The New Zealand Ministry for Culture and Heritage gives a translation of "sea breeze" for Haumoana.

The area is flat and low lying, with hills to the southwest. The underlying soil material has been laid down by rivers and the sea margin. Particle size ranges from gravel to clay. Nearer the beach the area is underlain by free draining sandy-gravels but further inland the gravels are overlain by poor draining silt and clay rich soils. Parts of the beach are experiencing coastal erosion of 0.7 metres per year, which resulted in the removal of several houses along the gravel beach crest, and other beach front properties being inundated during heavy swells and high tides.

Due to its location near the beach in an area prone to coastal erosion, parts of the beach at Haumoana is being eroded. The long term shoreline retreat at Haumoana is on average between 0.30 m and 0.70 m per year. This rate of erosion is the same as it is at Te Awanga further down the Bay coastline. The coastal erosion rate at Clifton south of Te Awanga is slightly higher.

Haumoana has a reticulated water supply managed by the Hastings District Council. An estimated 3% gain their water independently through rain water collection or from individual water bores. Wastewater is disposed using individual septic tanks.

Demographics
It is part of the wider Haumoana-Te Awanga statistical area.

Haumoana had a population of 1,161 at the 2018 New Zealand census, a decrease of 33 people (−2.8%) since the 2013 census, and a decrease of 36 people (−3.0%) since the 2006 census. There were 447 households, comprising 579 males and 579 females, giving a sex ratio of 1.0 males per female, with 231 people (19.9%) aged under 15 years, 189 (16.3%) aged 15 to 29, 585 (50.4%) aged 30 to 64, and 156 (13.4%) aged 65 or older.

Ethnicities were 85.5% European/Pākehā, 20.2% Māori, 2.1% Pacific peoples, 2.8% Asian, and 1.8% other ethnicities. People may identify with more than one ethnicity.

Although some people chose not to answer the census's question about religious affiliation, 61.2% had no religion, 24.8% were Christian, 3.4% had Māori religious beliefs, 0.5% were Muslim, 1.0% were Buddhist and 1.8% had other religions.

Of those at least 15 years old, 204 (21.9%) people had a bachelor's or higher degree, and 147 (15.8%) people had no formal qualifications. 147 people (15.8%) earned over $70,000 compared to 17.2% nationally. The employment status of those at least 15 was that 519 (55.8%) people were employed full-time, 177 (19.0%) were part-time, and 36 (3.9%) were unemployed.

Haumoana-Te Awanga statistical area

Haumoana-Te Awanga had a population of 1,926 at the 2018 New Zealand census, an increase of 3 people (0.2%) since the 2013 census, and unchanged since the 2006 census. There were 747 households, comprising 966 males and 960 females, giving a sex ratio of 1.01 males per female. The median age was 44.5 years (compared with 37.4 years nationally), with 351 people (18.2%) aged under 15 years, 291 (15.1%) aged 15 to 29, 981 (50.9%) aged 30 to 64, and 300 (15.6%) aged 65 or older.

Ethnicities were 88.0% European/Pākehā, 18.8% Māori, 2.0% Pacific peoples, 2.3% Asian, and 2.2% other ethnicities. People may identify with more than one ethnicity.

The percentage of people born overseas was 16.4, compared with 27.1% nationally.

Although some people chose not to answer the census's question about religious affiliation, 59.5% had no religion, 27.1% were Christian, 2.2% had Māori religious beliefs, 0.2% were Hindu, 0.5% were Muslim, 0.9% were Buddhist and 2.5% had other religions.

Of those at least 15 years old, 369 (23.4%) people had a bachelor's or higher degree, and 240 (15.2%) people had no formal qualifications. The median income was $34,900, compared with $31,800 nationally. 261 people (16.6%) earned over $70,000 compared to 17.2% nationally. The employment status of those at least 15 was that 846 (53.7%) people were employed full-time, 291 (18.5%) were part-time, and 45 (2.9%) were unemployed.

Education

Notable people
John Scott, architect
Paul Holmes, media personality

References

Hastings District
Beaches of the Hawke's Bay Region
Populated places in the Hawke's Bay Region
Populated places around Hawke Bay